Stephens Passage is a channel in the Alexander Archipelago in the southeastern region of the U.S. state of Alaska. It runs between Admiralty Island to the west and the Alaska mainland and Douglas Island to the east, and is about 170 km (105 mi) long. Juneau, the capital of Alaska, is near the north end, on Gastineau Channel.

Stephens Passage was named in 1794 by George Vancouver, probably for Sir Philip Stephens. It was first charted the same year by Joseph Whidbey, master of HMS Discovery during Vancouver's 1791-95 expedition. The passage was surveyed by the US Coast & Geodetic Survey (USCGS) ship Explorer and two smaller vessels in 1920.

References

External links
Panorama of the passage and Admiralty Island.

Straits of Alaska
Bodies of water of Juneau, Alaska
Bodies of water of Hoonah–Angoon Census Area, Alaska